Atherton State High School (ASHS) is a co-educational, state secondary school in Atherton, Queensland.

Education
TAFE and Atherton High School are linked through vocational education and training programs offered. The Atherton TAFE Branch is located in on the school site, as is the Trade Training Centre in construction.

Cultural
Programs in music are available to junior and senior students. The music academy performs at key school and community events.  Instrumental music students can have their private tutorials complimented through the school's instrumental music program. Public performance is also enhanced through the drama and dance programs. Opportunities exist for students in all year levels to participate in school shows, musicals, community drama events and  state showcase spectaculars.

Sport
The school has four sports teams, competing for three sports titles: athletics, cross-country, and swimming. They are Eacham, Euramo, Quincan and Barrine. Team names signify lakes throughout the Tableland region.

The school participates in many sporting competitions, with students competing in a broad range of sports at district, regional, state and national levels.

Attendance
The school's attendance is approximately 802 students, including a number of international students.

Notable alumni
 Dallas Johnson
 Peter Beattie

See also
Education in Australia

References

External links 
Atherton State High School home page

Public high schools in Queensland
Schools in Far North Queensland
Educational institutions established in 1959
1959 establishments in Australia